S Burjavalasa is a village located in Dattirajeru tehsil of Vizianagaram District. It is 15 km away from Dattirajeru and 45 km away from Vizianagaram.

References

Villages in Vizianagaram district